David Christopher Patton (born May 18, 1984) is an American former professional baseball pitcher. He played in Major League Baseball (MLB) for the Chicago Cubs.

Career
Patton graduated from Kentridge High School in 2002, and then attended Green River Community College. He was selected by the Colorado Rockies in 12th Round (350th overall) of 2004 MLB draft and made his Minor League debut in 2004, with the Casper Rockies, going 2-3 in 17 games. He split the 2005 season with the Tri-City Dust Devils and the Asheville Tourists. Patton had a 7-4 record in Single-A Asheville in 2006. In 2007 and 2008, Patton pitched for the Modesto Nuts, having a combined 9-10 record in two seasons there.

Patton was chosen by the Chicago Cubs in the 2008 Rule 5 Draft and was added to the Cubs' opening day bullpen. Patton appeared in 20 games for the Cubs, managing to compile a 3–1 record despite a 6.83 ERA with 19 walks and 23 strikeouts. He was released by the Cubs on December 12, 2010 and did not appear in professional game.

See also
Rule 5 draft results

External links

1984 births
Living people
Baseball players from Seattle
Major League Baseball pitchers
Chicago Cubs players
Green River Gators baseball players
Casper Rockies players
Tri-City Dust Devils players
Asheville Tourists players
Modesto Nuts players
Phoenix Desert Dogs players
Tennessee Smokies players
Iowa Cubs players
Daytona Cubs players